Andrei Daniel Vlad (born 15 April 1999) is a Romanian professional footballer who plays as a goalkeeper for Liga I side FCSB.

Club career

Early years / Universitatea Craiova
Vlad played youth football for CSȘ Târgoviște in his hometown before joining the academy of Universitatea Craiova in 2015. He made his debut as a professional with the latter on 7 May 2017, aged 18, featuring the full 90 minutes in a 0–1 Liga I defeat to eventual champions Viitorul Constanța.

FCSB
On 9 July 2017, FCSB announced the signing of Vlad on a six-year contract with a €30 million buyout clause. Vlad played his first game for FCSB on 9 September 2017, also a 0–1 loss against Viitorul Constanța. His first European appearance came on 23 November against Viktoria Plzeň.

On 15 February 2018, after first-choice goalkeeper Florin Niță departed for Sparta Prague, Vlad started against Lazio in the Europa League round of 32's first leg; he managed to keep a clean sheet as his team won 1–0. Vlad then became though an understudy to Cristian Bălgrădean, who was signed a few days prior to the second leg in Rome.

He started to appear frequently for the Roș-albaștrii in the 2019–20 season, amassing 27 appearances in all competitions comprised.

International career
Vlad made his debut for the Romania national team in a friendly against Georgia on 2 June 2021, playing the full match in the 1–2 surprising home loss.

Career statistics

Club

International

Honours
FCSB
Cupa României: 2019–20
Supercupa României runner-up: 2020

Individual
UEFA European Under-21 Championship Team of the Tournament: 2021

References

External links

1999 births
Living people
Sportspeople from Târgoviște
Romanian footballers
Romania youth international footballers
Romania under-21 international footballers
Romania international footballers
Association football goalkeepers
Liga I players
CS Universitatea Craiova players
FC Steaua București players